Babylone (in Arabic بابيلون) is an Algerian musical group established in 2012 with three principal members being Amine Mohamed Djemal, Rahim El Hadi and Ramzy Ayadi. The band has released the studio album Brya in 2013 after huge success of their single "Zina" that won Algerian Song of the Year during the Algerian Music Awards 2014 with the band itself winning "Algerian Band of the Year". Babylone sings mainly in Algerian Dziriya or derja in a musical style known as "dziri style", being Algerian world music with various international music influences.

Members
The band was launched in 2012 by Amine Mohamed Djemal, a singer songwriter and by Rahim El Hadi, a guitarist and composer coming from a very musical family. Childhood friends both originating from Gouraya, Tipaza, Algeria. With Djemal specializing in dentistry and El Hadi as a software specialist, they joined forces with Ramzy Ayadi, a university colleague and guitarist / composer originating from Constantine, Algeria specializing at the time as a software engineer at the same university.

In studio and in live concerts, to achieve a more complete sound, they are joined by guitarist Rafik Chami, bass player Redouane Nehar and percussionist Fouad Tourki.

Career
The band's break came when they were featured in the popular Algerian radio show "Serial Taggeur" that encouraged young musical talents in the country.

Their debut album Brya (The letter) was released in June 2013 with 10 songs including the band's massive hit "Zina" produced by Aswatt Studio. The song won the "Song of the Year" in Algeria.

The group promotes Algerian folk tradition from various localities mixing them with Andalousian, Arab, Mediterranean, Western, Oriental and African styles. In 2015, the group was nominated as one of the six finalists for "Best Traditional Group of Africa" during the Kora Awards (The KORA All Africa Music Awards 2016).

Members
Main
Amine Mohamed Djamel - vocals and guitar
Rahim El Hadi - lead guitar
Ramzy Ayadi - guitare
Auxiliary
Rafik Cham - guitar
Redouane Nehar - bass
Fouad Tourki - percussion
Islam Benzina (supervisor)

Discography

Albums
2013: Brya

Singles
2012: "Zina"
2014: "Kahlete Laâyoune"
2017: "Bekitini"
2018: "La La"
2018: "Alach"
2021: "Kataa Lbhour" (in Arabic قاطع لبحور)

References

External links
Facebook

Algerian musical groups
Musical groups established in 2012
2012 establishments in Algeria